Egalitarianism as a Revolt Against Nature and Other Essays is a 1974 book by economist Murray Rothbard.

The book's title comes from the lead essay, which argues that egalitarian theory always results in a politics of statist control because it is founded on revolt against the ontological structure of reality itself. According to Rothbard in this lead essay, statist intellectuals attempt to replace what exists with a Romantic image of an idealized primitive state of nature, an ideal which cannot and should not be achieved, according to Rothbard. The implications of this point are worked out on topics such as market economics, child rights, environmentalism, feminism, foreign policy, redistribution and others.

Publishing history
 Auburn, Alabama: Ludwig von Mises Institute. 2000. Paperback. .
 Washington, D.C.: Libertarian Review Press. June 1974.

References

External links
 Egalitarianism as a Revolt Against Nature and Other Essays full text PDF file of the Second Edition

1974 non-fiction books
American non-fiction books
Books about capitalism
Books in political philosophy
Books by Murray Rothbard
Economic ideologies
Egalitarianism
English-language books
Political books
Sociology books